The Rural Municipality of Big Arm No. 251 is a rural municipality (RM) in the Canadian province of Saskatchewan within Census Division No. 11 and  Division No. 5. It is located in the southern portion of the province near Last Mountain Lake northwest of Regina.

History 
The RM of Big Arm No. 251 incorporated as a rural municipality on December 11, 1911.

Geography

Communities and localities 
The following urban municipalities are surrounded by the RM.

Towns
 Imperial

Villages
 Liberty

Resort villages
 Etters Beach

The following unincorporated communities are located within the RM.

Unincorporated hamlets
 Hendersons Beach
 Stalwart

Demographics 

Government 
The RM of Big Arm No. 251 is governed by an elected municipal council and an appointed administrator that meets on the second Monday of every month. The reeve of the RM is Sheldon Vance while its administrator is Yvonne (Bonny) Goodsman. The RM's office is located in Imperial.

References 

B

Division No. 11, Saskatchewan